The Netherlands national baseball team is the national baseball team of the Kingdom of the Netherlands, representing the country in international men's baseball. They are currently ranked as the best team in the WBSC Europe, and the team is also ranked seventh in the WBSC World Rankings.

The Netherlands participated in the Summer Olympic Games in 1996, 2000, 2004, and 2008. The team has also participated in both of the other major international baseball tournaments recognised by the International Baseball Federation (IBAF): the World Baseball Classic (WBC) and the Baseball World Cup. In 2011, the team won the World Cup after beating 25-time champion Cuba in the finals. The team is controlled by the Royal Netherlands Baseball and Softball Federation, which is represented in the WBSC Europe.

The team is made up primarily of players from the Netherlands in Europe, and from Dutch territories and islands in the Caribbean that are part of the Kingdom of the Netherlands, such as Aruba and Curaçao (which is part of the former Netherlands Antilles, which have since been dissolved), where baseball is extremely popular. Some foreigners of Dutch descent have also been members of the team.  While baseball only maintains a niche following throughout Europe, the Netherlands, along with Italy, are the two European countries where the sport's popularity is strongest; the team has finished in either first or second place in each of the 31 European Baseball Championships in which it has appeared.

The team played in the 2017 World Baseball Classic, and finished in 4th place. It won the 2019 European Baseball Championship, winning a gold medal. It then competed at the Africa/Europe 2020 Olympic Qualification tournament, in Italy in September 2019, taking second place behind Team Israel. The team tried but failed to qualify for the 2020 Olympics at the three-team Final Qualifying Tournament in late June 2021.

Results and fixtures

The following is a list of professional baseball match results currently active in the latest version of the WBSC World Rankings, as well as any future matches that have been scheduled.

Legend

2019

2021

2022

2023

Current roster

Tournament record

World Baseball Classic

The Netherlands has competed in all four of the World Baseball Classic tournaments held. All 16 teams that played in the 2006 edition were invited to compete in the second in 2009. The team was an automatic qualifier for the 2013 and 2017 tournaments.

The Netherlands has progressed to the second round of competition in 2009, and achieved its highest finish, 4th, in both the 2013 and 2017 tournaments. Unusual for international competition in baseball, the squads selected in the World Baseball Classic tournaments featured players active in Major League Baseball in addition to Minor League, Nippon Professional Baseball, and local players. Generally players in the Major Leagues are unavailable due to their contracts with the respective clubs.

The Netherlands team in the World Baseball Classic has featured several Major Leaguers: Andruw Jones, Sidney Ponson, Randall Simon, Roger Bernadina,  Shairon Martis, Jonathan Schoop, Xander Bogaerts, Andrelton Simmons, Didi Gregorius, Jurickson Profar, and Kenley Jansen, most born in the Caribbean in either Aruba or Curaçao.

2006
Prior to the 2006 World Baseball Classic, the Netherlands played four exhibition games. They lost two games, against a college team from the University of Tampa and an Atlanta Braves squad, at Cracker Jack Stadium in Kissimmee, Florida.

The Netherlands competed in Pool C—along with world champion Cuba, Panama, and Puerto Rico—in the first round at the Hiram Bithorn Stadium in San Juan, Puerto Rico.

Having failed to win against Cuba and Puerto Rico in their round-robin pool games, they finished third in their pool, and were eliminated along with Panama.

2009
Prior to the 2009 World Baseball Classic, the Netherlands played seven exhibition games, including three games against the Pittsburgh Pirates, Cincinnati Reds, and Minnesota Twins. The Netherlands team lost all three games against these MLB opponents.

The Netherlands competed in Pool D, along with 2006 WBC semi-finalist Dominican Republic, Panama, and Puerto Rico, in the first round at Hiram Bithorn Stadium in San Juan, Puerto Rico. The team won both games against the strong Dominican Republic team. As result, the team made it through the first double-elimination round along with Puerto Rico.

In the second round the Dutch lost both their games against Venezuela and the United States. Therefore, the team was eliminated and finished 7th in the final standings.

2013

The Netherlands competed in Pool B against Chinese Taipei, South Korea, and Australia at the Taichung Intercontinental Baseball Stadium in Taichung, Taiwan. The Dutch team won their first game against South Korea 5-0, but lost to the Chinese Taipei 8-3. However, the Netherlands won against Australia 4-1, thus securing their position for Round 1 in Tokyo Dome to face off against Japan and Cuba.

The Dutch team defeated the Cuban team 6-2 before facing two-time defending champion Japan and earned a humiliating loss 16-4 at the end of 7th inning due to mercy rule and faced off against Cuba once again. They narrowly clinched their win against the Cuban team 7-6 to secure their position in the semi-finals where they lost against the Japanese team again 10-6. They faced off against the Dominican Republic where they lost 4-1. The Netherlands finished 4th overall.

2017

Team Netherlands, ranked 9th in the world, included major league stars, many of whom were raised in islands in the Caribbean that are part of the Kingdom of the Netherlands. The players included All Star shortstop Xander Bogaerts (Boston Red Sox; from Aruba), 20-home-run-hitter shortstop Didi Gregorius (New York Yankees; raised in Curaçao, which is part of the former Netherlands Antilles which have since been dissolved), 20-home-run-hitter second baseman Jonathan Schoop (Baltimore Orioles; born in Curaçao), Gold-Glover shortstop Andrelton Simmons (Los Angeles Angels; born in Curaçao), and infielder/outfielder Jurickson Profar (Texas Rangers; born in Curaçao). Sports Illustrated opined that the Dutch team "boasts arguably the most talented infield in the entire tournament."

The Netherlands was defeated by Team Israel (4-2). It then beat South Korea (5-0) and Taiwan (6-5), in the first round of the 2017 World Baseball Classic. Along with Israel, which came in ahead of it in the pool, it qualified for the next round, in Japan.

In what NBC reported was thought to be the tallest batter-pitcher matchup in baseball history, the Dutch team’s  pitcher Loek van Mil walked Israel's  first baseman Nate Freiman.

In the second round an extra innings loss against Japan was followed by two mercy rule wins against Israel and Cuba. Together with Japan which had finished top of the pool the Netherlands advanced to the championship round. 2016 All Star and NL Reliever of the Year Kenley Jansen joined the Dutch team for the championship round.

The Netherlands semifinal match against Puerto Rico ended with an 11th inning walk-off sac fly by Eddie Rosario. The final score was 3-4. Dutch outfielder Wladimir Balentien was chosen in the All-WBC team.

Olympics

The Dutch best finish in an Olympics is fifth place, which they did in both 1996 & 2000. Netherlands finished with a 1-2 record, with its only victory coming against Chinese Taipei. There was no official placing as Baseball at the 1988 Summer Olympics was a demonstration sport.

It competed at the Africa/Europe 2020 Olympic Qualification tournament, in Italy in September 2019, taking second place behind Israel.

Baseball World Cup
In , the Netherlands was one of the 8 European nations to host the 2009 Baseball World Cup. It marked the first time in history that the World Cup was not hosted by a specific country, but rather by a whole continent.

European Baseball Championship
Team Netherlands won the 2019 European Baseball Championship, winning a gold medal. Among the players competing for it were Roger Bernadina, Mike Bolsenbroek, Donny Breek, Rob Cordemans, Tom de Blok, Yurendell DeCaster, Lars Huijer, Kevin Kelly, Dwayne Kemp, Diego Markwell, Randolph Oduber, Dashenko Ricardo, Shairon Martis, Kalian Sams, Sharlon Schoop, Curt Smith, Tom Stuifbergen, JC Sulbaran, and Orlando Yntema.

European Baseball Championship

Other tournament results
Intercontinental Cup

Haarlemse Honkbalweek

World Port Tournament

World Junior Baseball Championship

European Junior Baseball Championship